Brain-type creatine kinase also known as CK-BB is a creatine kinase that in humans is encoded by the CKB gene.

Function 

The protein encoded by this gene, CK-BB, consists of a homodimer of two identical brain-type CK-B subunits. BB-CK is a cytoplasmic enzyme involved in cellular energy homeostasis, with certain fractions of the enzyme being bound to cell membranes, ATPases, and a variety of ATP-requiring enzymes in the cell. There, CK-BB forms tightly coupled microcompartments for in situ regeneration of ATP that has been used up. The encoded protein reversibly catalyzes the transfer of "energy-rich" phosphate between ATP and creatine or between phospho-creatine (PCr) and ADP. Its functional entity is a homodimer (CK-BB) in brain and smooth muscle as well as in other tissues and cells such as neuronal cells, retina, kidney, bone, etc.  In heart, a heterodimer (CK-MB) shahil consisting of one CK-B brain-type CK subunit and one CK-M muscle-type CK subunit is prominently expressed.  The encoded CK-BB and CK-MB proteins are members of the ATP:guanido phosphotransferase protein family.

Ectopic expression 

Ectopic expression (CKBE) of the B (brain) type of creatine kinase (CK-BB) in red cells and platelets is a rare, benign anomaly detected during a newborn screening program for Duchenne muscular dystrophy.

References

External links